Choi Dae-sung (born February 2, 1976) is a South Korean actor.

Filmography

Film

Television series

References

External links 
 
 
 

1976 births
Living people
South Korean male stage actors
South Korean male television actors
South Korean male film actors
South Korean male web series actors